Pokémon: Advanced Battle is the eighth season of Pokémon and the third season of Pokémon the Series: Ruby and Sapphire, known in Japan as . It originally aired in Japan from September 9, 2004, to September 29, 2005, on TV Tokyo, and in the United States from September 17, 2005, to July 8, 2006, on Kids' WB. The series follows the adventures of the ten-year-old Pokémon trainer Ash Ketchum, and his electric mouse partner Pikachu as he continues traveling through Hoenn with Brock, May, and Max. Beginning with "The Scheme Team", Ash collect Gym Badges in the Hoenn region so they can compete in the Hoenn League competition. Along the way, they are joined by Brock, the leader of the Pewter City Gym, and the Pokémon coordinator May and her brother, Max, as May competes in Pokémon Contests with the aim of earning Ribbons so she can enter the Hoenn Grand Festival. Afterwards, Ash returns to the Kanto region to compete in the Battle Frontier by earning Frontier Symbols from Frontier Brains, while May continues competing to earn Contest Ribbons so she can enter the Kanto Grand Festival.

The episodes were directed by Masamitsu Hidaka and produced by the animation studio OLM.



Episode list

Music
The Japanese opening songs are "Challenger!!" (チャレンジャー!!, Charenjā!!) by Rika Matsumoto for 13 episodes, "Pokemon Symphonic Medley" (ポケモンシンフォニック メドレー, Pokémon Shinfonikku Medorē) by the Pokémon Symphonic Orchestra (Pokémon Choir) for 29 episodes, and "Battle Frontier (Japanese song)" (バトルフロンツア, Batoru Furontia) by Akina Takaya for 11 episodes. The ending songs are "Smile" (スマイル, Sumairu) by Toshiko Ezaki for 6 episodes, "GLORY DAY 〜That Shining Day〜" (GLORY DAY 〜輝くその日〜, GLORY DAY 〜Kagayaku Sono Hi〜) by GARDEN for 35 episodes, "Pokémon Counting Song" (ポケモンかぞえうた, Pokémon Kazoe Uta) by Akiko Kanazawa for 11 episodes, and the English opening song is "Unbeatable" by David Rolfe, with a shortened version used in the end credits.

Home media releases
In the United States, the series was released on 10 DVD volumes by Viz Media, each containing 5 or 6 episodes each.

Viz Media and Warner Home Video later released Pokémon: Advanced Battle – The Complete Collection on DVD on June 12, 2018.

Notes

References

External links 
 
  at TV Tokyo 
  at TV Tokyo 
  at Pokémon JP official website 

2004 Japanese television seasons
2005 Japanese television seasons
Season08